Bylot may refer to:

Places 
 Bylot Island, Nunavut, Canada, named after explorer Robert Bylot
 Bylot, Manitoba
 Bylot railway station
 Bylot Sound, also called North Star Bay, in Wolstenholme Fjord, Greenland

People 
Robert Bylot, 17th-century explorer in the Canadian Arctic region